Farmer Al Falfa (also known as Farmer Alfalfa), the quintessential grizzly old farmer type, is an animated cartoon character created by American cartoonist Paul Terry. He first appeared in Down On the Phoney Farm (1915), a short Terry cartoon distributed by the Thanhouser Company. Next came a series of shorts produced by Terry for Bray Studios, starting with Farmer Al Falfa's Cat-Tastrophe (1916).

After leaving Bray, Terry retained the character, making new shorts for Edison and Paramount over the few years following. Terry then used Farmer Al Falfa frequently during the 1920s for his Aesop's Film Fables series, the character's most prolific period.  By this time, the Farmer had been redesigned to allow simplified animation, necessary as the Fables were released by Pathé on a weekly basis.  The Farmer's head and arms could be drawn on a separate cel while the rest of his body was drawn on another, a technique anticipating the limited animation of TV cartoons.  When Terry made the transition to sound, so did the Farmer. The first publicly released sound cartoon, Dinner Time, featured Farmer Al Falfa as an irritable butcher who had to fend off a pack of hungry hounds. However, the short failed to grasp the public's interest like Walt Disney's Steamboat Willie, released one month later.

In 1929, Terry left his producer, Amadee J. Van Beuren to open his own studio, with distribution covered by Educational Pictures. The farmer was again revived in 1930, beginning with French Fried, and continuing until 1937, in which the character would only appear irregularly until 1955.

For roughly a year, the farmer continued to appear in Van Beuren's cartoons, now being made by former Terry associates John Foster and Mannie Davis (both of whom would rejoin Terry a few years later.)  Terry threatened legal action against his former producer, as the character was established as his own property, not Van Beuren's; and the farmer stopped appearing in Van Beuren's films. But as Terry's studio began to grow and develop, Farmer Al Falfa wore out his welcome and was subsequently all but retired. The Farmer never entirely disappeared, though; he was featured as a supporting player in the first two Heckle and Jeckle cartoons, released in 1946, and starred in Uranium Blues (1956) ten years later.

In the fall of 1958, the white-bearded protagonist starred in the syndicated television program Farmer Al Falfa and his Terrytoon Pals, a compilation of the earlier black and white Terry shorts. Though no longer for sale in the mainstream television market, most of the early cartoons, the silents in particular, have surfaced on public domain compilations including, most notably, Video Yesteryear's Cartoonal Knowledge VHS series from the 1980s.

In the early 1950s, the character was unofficially rechristened "Farmer Gray", probably by Fred Sayles, the host of a children's program called Junior Frolics on station WATV in Newark, New Jersey, Sayles certainly named some of the subsidiary characters (presumably previously nameless), e.g., "Bumpy" the donkey, "Casper" and "Bad Mike", the cats, and "Marty" and "Millie", the mice. 

In mid-1950s Terrytoons comics, the character was also briefly rechristened "Farmer Gray", presumably in an effort to capitalize on "Junior Frolics". But the renaming in comics did not last—it was done inconsistently (sometimes changing from month to month), and by the late 1950s, the character's original name was back permanently.

Farmer Al Falfa was going to have a cameo in Who Framed Roger Rabbit, alongside other Terrytoons characters such as Mighty Mouse, Heckle and Jeckle, and others, but rights to the character could not be obtained in time.

See also
Farmer Al Falfa filmography
Animation Before Hollywood: The Silent Period
Humbug

References

Crafton, Donald (1993): Before Mickey: The Animated Film, 1898-1928. University of Chicago Press.
Maltin, Leonard (1987): Of Mice and Magic: A History of American Animated Cartoons. Penguin Books.

External links
Farmer Al Falfa at the Internet Movie Database

Film characters introduced in 1915
Film series introduced in 1915
Animated film series
Fictional farmers
Terrytoons characters
Van Beuren Studios
Male characters in animation
Bray Productions film series
Animated characters introduced in 1915